Oskar Petrus Nilsson (25 January 1897 – 29 March 1958) was a Swedish vaulter who competed in the 1920 Summer Olympics. He was part of the Swedish team that won the bronze medal in vaulting. In the individual vaulting competition he finished sixteenth, one place ahead of his compatriot Oscar Nilsson.

References

1897 births
1958 deaths
Swedish male equestrians
Olympic equestrians of Sweden
Equestrians at the 1920 Summer Olympics
Olympic bronze medalists for Sweden
Olympic medalists in equestrian
Medalists at the 1920 Summer Olympics
People from Valdemarsvik Municipality
Sportspeople from Östergötland County
20th-century Swedish people